A Friend in California is the forty-first studio album by American recording artist Merle Haggard with backing by The Strangers, released in 1986.

Recording and composition
Haggard produced the album with Ron "Snake" Reynolds. Most of the songs were written by Haggard and Freddy Powers, who had become one of Haggard's favorite writers during this period. A Friend in California boasts a re-energized-sounding Haggard performing several up-tempo numbers like "This Song is for You," "Silverthorn Mountain," and "I Had a Beautiful Time." He also plays off his own legend with "The Okie from Muskogee's Comin' Home" and the autobiographical "Mama's Prayer" which pays tribute to his late mother. Other noteworthy tracks is his bluesy take on the Floyd Tillman classic "This Cold War with You" and the obligatory western swing paean "Texas."

Critical reception

Music critic Robert Christgau wrote "Just when I decide he's gonna lay back forever he ambles into this. No Nippophobia, minimal love pap, a touch of Mexico, and lots of swing—except for one Freddy Powers pledge it keeps going till the obligatory sentimentality of the last two cuts."

Track listing
"A Friend in California" (Freddy Powers) – 3:18
"This Time I Really Do" (Powers) – 3:00
"This Cold War with You" (Floyd Tillman) – 1:52
"I Had a Beautiful Time" (Haggard) – 3:01
"Texas" (Haggard, Powers) – 3:01
"The Okie from Muskogee's Comin' Home" (Haggard, Powers) – 2:23
"Mama's Prayer" (Haggard) – 2:50
"Silverthorn Mountain" (Haggard) – 2:01
"This Song is for You" (Powers, Mary Lou Powers) – 3:32
"Thank You For Keeping Our House" (Haggard, Debbie Parret) – 3:18

Personnel
Merle Haggard – vocals, guitar, fiddle

The Strangers:
Roy Nichols – guitar
Norman Hamlet – steel guitar, dobro
Clint Strong – guitar
Mark Yeary – keyboards
Dennis Hromek – bass
Biff Adam – drums
Jimmy Belken – fiddle
Don Markham – trumpet, saxophone
Gary Church – trombone, trumpet

with:
Freddy Powers – backing vocals

and:
Donna Faye – backing vocals

Charts

Weekly charts

Year-end charts

References

Merle Haggard albums
1986 albums
Epic Records albums